The 2014 Volta a Portugal was a men's road bicycle race held from 30 July to 10 August 2014. It was the 76th edition of the men's stage race to be held, which was established in 1927. As part of the 2014 UCI Europe Tour, it is rated as a 2.1 event.

The Spanish cyclist Gustavo César from  won the race.

Participating teams
In total, 16 teams competed.
National teams:

Portugal (national team)
International teams:

Schedule

Stages

Prologue
30 July 2014 — Fafe to Fafe, individual time trial (ITT)

Stage 1
31 July 2014 — Lousada to Maia,

Stage 2
1 August 2014 — Gondomar to Braga,

Stage 3
2 August 2014 — Viana do Castelo to Montalegre–,

Stage 4
3 August 2014 — Boticas to Mondim de Basto–,

Stage 5
4 August 2014 — Alvarenga to Santo Tirso–Alto da Nossa Senhora da Assunção,

Stage 6
5 August 2014 — Oliveira do Bairro to Viseu,

Stage 7
7 August 2014 — Belmonte to Seia–Alto da Torre,

Stage 8
8 August 2014 — Sabugal to Castelo Branco,

Stage 9
9 August 2014 — Oleiros to Sertã, individual time trial (ITT)

Stage 10
10 August 2014 —  to Lisbon,

Classification leadership

References

External links

2014
Volta a Portugal
Volta a Portugal